The Act of Declaration of Independence of Ukraine was adopted by the Supreme Soviet of the Ukrainian SSR on 24 August 1991. The Act reestablished Ukraine's state independence.

Adoption 
The Act was adopted in the aftermath of the coup attempt in the Soviet Union on 19 August, when hardline Communist leaders attempted to restore central Communist party control over the USSR. In response (during a tense 11-hour extraordinary session), the Supreme Soviet (parliament) of the Ukrainian SSR, in a special Saturday session, overwhelmingly approved the Act of Declaration. The Act passed with 321 votes in favor, 2 votes against, and 6 abstentions (out of 360 attendants). The text was largely composed during the night of 23 August–24 August mainly by Levko Lukyanenko, Serhiy Holovatyi, Mykhailo Horyn, Ivan Zayets and Vyacheslav Chornovil.

The Communist Party of Ukraine (CPU), with the campaigning behind the scenes by its fellow Party member and Ukrainian Supreme Soviet Chairman Leonid Kravchuk, felt compelled to support the Act in order to distance itself from the coup. CPU First Secretary Stanislav Hurenko argued that "it will be a disaster" if the CPU were to fail to support independence. CPU members had been unnerved by the news of former Ukrainian SSR party leader Vladimir Ivashko's arrest in Moscow, the re-subordination of the Soviet Army under the leaders of the Russian SFSR and the sealing of the Soviet Communist Party Central Committee's premises.

The same day (24 August), the parliament called for a referendum on support for the Declaration of Independence. The proposal for calling the national referendum came jointly from opposition leaders Ihor Yukhnovsky and Dmytro Pavlychko. The Parliament also voted for the creation of a national guard of Ukraine and turned jurisdiction over all the armed forces located on Ukrainian territory over to itself.

Other than a noisy crowd that had gathered at the Parliament building, the streets of Kyiv were quiet that day, with few signs of open celebration.

In the days that followed, a number of resolutions and decrees were passed: nationalizing all CPU property and handing it over to the Supreme Soviet and local councils; issuing an amnesty for all political prisoners; suspending all CPU activities and freezing CPU assets and bank accounts pending official investigations into possible collaboration with the Moscow coup plotters; setting up a committee of inquiry into official behavior during the coup; and establishing a committee on military matters related to the creation of a Ministry of Defense of Ukraine.

On 26 August 1991, the Permanent Representative of the Ukrainian SSR to the United Nations (Soviet Ukraine being a founding member of the United Nations), Hennadiy Udovenko, informed the office of the Secretary General of the United Nations that his permanent mission to this international assembly would officially be designated as representing Ukraine. That same day, the executive committee of Kyiv also voted to remove all the monuments of Communist heroes from public places, including the Lenin monument in the central October Revolution Square. The committee decided that the large square would be renamed Maidan Nezalezhnosti (Independence Square) as would the central Metro station below it.

Two days later, more than 200,000 Lviv and Lviv oblast residents declared their readiness to serve in the national guard.

In the independence referendum on 1 December 1991, the people of Ukraine expressed deep and widespread support for the Act of Declaration of Independence, with more than 90% voting in favor, and 84% of the electorate participating. The referendum took place on the same day as Ukraine's first direct presidential election; all six presidential candidates supported independence and campaigned for a "yes" vote. The referendum's passage ended any realistic chance of the Soviet Union remaining together even on a limited scale; Ukraine had long been second only to Russia in economic and political power in the USSR.

A week after the election, newly elected president Leonid Kravchuk joined his Russian and Belarusian counterparts (Boris Yeltsin and Stanislav Shushkevich, respectively) in signing the Belovezh Accords, which declared that the Soviet Union had ceased to exist. The Soviet Union officially dissolved on 26 December.

Since 1992, the 24th of August is celebrated in Ukraine as Independence Day.

International recognition 
Poland and Canada were the first countries to recognize Ukraine's independence, both on 2 December 1991. On the same day (2 December) it was reported during the late-evening airing of the television news program Vesti that the President of the Russian SFSR, Boris Yeltsin, had recognized Ukraine's independence.

The United States did so on 25 December 1991. That month the independence of Ukraine was recognized by 68 states, and in 1992 it was recognized by another 64 states.

In January 1992, U.S. President George H. W. Bush approved a program of American humanitarian support for Ukraine and the rest of the former USSR, supervised by the Secretary of Defense.

By the end of 1991 there was widespread international recognition.

Text

References

External links 

 Act of Declaration of Independence of Ukraine – Official Verkhovna Rada website
 Act of Declaration of Independence of Ukraine – Official Verkhovna Rada website
 Act of Declaration of the Independence of Ukraine – The Ukrainian Weekly, translation by The Ukrainian Weekly
 Declaration of Independence of Ukraine – The Windsor Viter, Volume 12, Number 1, July, 2001 Part 2, translation by Andrew Gregorovich
 "Great Saturday" – an interview with writer and parliament deputy Stepan Pushyk on the events of August 24, 1991.

Political history of Ukraine
Government of Ukraine
1991 in law
1991 documents
1991 in international relations
Dissolution of the Soviet Union
Ukrainian independence movement
1991
1991 in Ukraine
History of Ukraine since 1991
August 1991 events in Europe
Ukraine
Leonid Kravchuk